Jean-Baptiste Prashant More (Tamil:ஜின் பாப்டிஸ்ட் பிரசாந்த் மொரே), also known as (J B Prashant More, JBP More) (Tamil:ஜே பி பிரசாந்த் மொரே, ஜே பி பி மொரே) is a French historian, author and teacher. His area of expertise is South Indian history.

Personal life 
JBP More was born to Panjab Rao More and Ellenamma Prouchandy in Pondicherry. Panjab Rao More was a Marathi by descent and he was a Bhakti Poet. He was a follower of Sant Tukaram and Sri Aurobindo. He belongs to the Morè clan who were vassals of the Bijapur Sultanate before being defeated and overcome by Shivaji during his ascension to power.

Authored Books 
The Political Evolution of Muslims in Tamilnadu and Madras, 1930-1947
Freedom Movement in French India, The Mahe Revolt of 1948
L’Inde face à Bharati, le Poète rebelle
Muslim identity, Print Culture and the Dravidian factor in India in Tamilnadu
Pudhucheriyil Bharatiyar in Tamil "புதுச்சேரியில் பாரதியார்"
Religion and Society in South India: Hindus, Muslims and Christians
The Telugus of Yanam and Masulipatnam : From French rule to Integration With India
Partition of India: Players and Partners
Rise and Fall of the ‘Dravidian’ Justice party, 1916-1946
Pudhucherry Valartha Bharathiyar in Tamil "புதுச்சேரி வளர்த்த பாரதியார்"
Origin and Early History of the Muslims of Keralam, 700-1600, A.D.
Indian Steamship Ventures 1836-1910. "Darmanathan Prouchandy of Pondicherry, First Steam Navigator from South India, 1891-1900"
Keralathile Muslimkal: Aavirbhavavum Adyakaala Charitravum (700 AD- 1600 AD) in Malayalam "കേരളത്തിലെ മുസ്ലിങ്ങൾ: ആവിർഭാവവും ആദ്യകാല ചരിത്രവും"
From Arikamedu to the Foundation of Modern Pondicherry
Origin and Foundation of Madras
Offerings to the Muslim Warriors of Malabar: Foundation Document of Colonialism and Clash of Civilisations
Tamil Heroes of French India: Their Role in Business, Social Reforms and in Netaji's Freedom Struggle from Vietnam
A Critique of Modern Civilization and Thought: Facts, Non-Facts and Ideas
Dravida Needhi Katchiyin Valarchiyum Veezhchiyum (1916-1946) in Tamil "திராவிட நீதிக் கட்சியின் வளர்ச்சியும் வீழ்ச்சியும் (1916-1946)
Jamal Mohamed - Indian Merchant Prince and Nationlist" (2022)Subramania Bharathi in British and French India: Nationalist, Revivalist or Thamizh Patriot" (UpComing)

References

External links

 J B Prashant More – Official website

20th-century French historians
Living people
1955 births
Indian emigrants to France
French male non-fiction writers
21st-century French historians
Historians of India
Naturalized citizens of France